Evidence of Heaven is the third studio album by Faith and the Muse.

Track listing

Credits
All instruments and voices performed by William Faith and Monica Richards (except "Joy")
All titles composed by Faith and the Muse © and p Elyrian Music, BMI, 1999 except:
"Old Souls," Written by Paul Williams
"Importune Me No More," Lyrics most likely written by Elizabeth I, late 16th century
"Joy," Performed by Joy Richards from her Classical repertoire, 1959
Recorded May - July, 1999 by William Faith at Wisperthal, Los Angeles, California and produced by Faith and the Muse except
"Denn Die Todten Reiten Schnell," Recorded Fall 1996 at The Eyesocket, Venice, California - Produced by Faith and the Muse and Chad Blinman
Layout, Artwork and Design by Monica Richards
Band Photo by kaRIN
Original lyrics by Monica Richards, except "Through the Pale Door" and "Denn Die Todten" written by William Faith.

References 

Faith and the Muse albums
1999 albums